Daniel D. Minier (1794–1849), of Lansing, New York, was an American who served as a major general in the New York State Militia, Infantry division. 

His father, Abram Minier, and uncle, Daniel Minier, were original Lake Country settlers in 1787. 

On family land, Minier constructed the Central Exchange Hotel, the first brick structure in Lansing. 

Minier died in 1849, and his remains were placed at Asbury Cemetery in Lansing.

References

1794 births
People from Lansing, New York
American militia generals
1849 deaths